The 42nd Telluride Film Festival took place on September 4–7, 2015, in Telluride, Colorado, United States.

Writer Rachel Kushner was appointed as the year's guest director. Telluride honored Rooney Mara, Danny Boyle, and Adam Curtis as the awardees of the Silver Medallion. Participant Media received the Special Medallion award. The festival line-up was announced on September 3, 2015.

Official selections

Main program

Guest Director's Selections
The films were selected and presented by the year's guest director, Rachel Kushner.

Filmmakers of Tomorrow

Student Prints
The selection was curated and introduced by Gregory Nava. It selected the best student-produced work around the world.

Calling Cards
The selection was curated by Barry Jenkins. It selected new works from promising filmmakers.

Great Expectations
The selection was curated by Barry Jenkins.

Backlot
The selection included behind-the-scene movies and portraits of artists, musicians, and filmmakers.

References

External links
 

2015 film festivals
2015 in Colorado
42nd